George Fead (1729?–1815), was a lieutenant-general and colonel-commandant fourth battalion Royal Artillery.

Career
Fead entered the Royal Military Academy, Woolwich, as a cadet 1 September 1756, became a lieutenant-fireworker Royal Artillery on 8 June 1756, second lieutenant in 1760, first lieutenant in 1764, captain-lieutenant in 1771, captain in 1779, brevet major in 1783, regimental major in 1792, lieutenant-colonel in 1793, brevet colonel in 1797, regimental colonel in 1799, major-general 1803, and lieutenant-general 1810. As a lieutenant-fireworker he was present at the Siege of Louisburg, Cape Breton, in 1758 during the Seven Years' War. He was afterwards taken prisoner at Newfoundland, but exchanged. Returning a second time to America he served there six or seven years, part of the time at Pensacola.

He served in Menorca from 1774 to 1781, and commanded the artillery during the defence of Fort St. Philip from August 1780 to February 1781, during which he lost an eye by the bursting of a shell. He was one of the witnesses on the trial of Lieutenant-general Hon. James Murray, the governor, on charges preferred by Sir William Draper. He went to Newfoundland a second time in 1790, and in 1794 served under the Duke of York in the Flanders Campaign. He went to Jamaica in 1799 and commanded the artillery there many years. He was made lieutenant-governor of Port Royal in 1810. Fead died at his residence, Woolwich Common, 20 November 1815, in the eighty-sixth year of his age and the fifty-eighth of his military service, thirty years of which had been passed abroad. He had nine sons in the service, several of whom were killed or died on duty abroad.

References

1729 births
1815 deaths
18th-century English people
19th-century English people
Royal Artillery officers
People from Woolwich
Graduates of the Royal Military Academy, Woolwich